Oriente is a station on the Red Line of the Lisbon Metro. The station is located in Lisbon, between the Cabo Ruivo and Moscavide stations. The station is a part of the Gare do Oriente, one of the main transport hubs of the city, serving the North, Sintra, and Azambuja Lines and also several bus lines.

History
The station opened on 19 May 1998 in conjunction with the Alameda, Olaias, Bela Vista and Chelas stations, with the original construction of the Red Line, connection central Lisbon to the new zone occupied by the EXPO'98.

The architectural project was made by Sanchez Jorge and the art work by Antonio Seguí, Arthur Boyd, Erró, Hundertwasser, Yayoi Kusama, Joaquim Rodrigo, Abdoulaye Konaté, Sean Scully, Raza, Zao Wou-Ki and Magdalena Abakanowicz.

Connections

Urban buses

Carris 
 208 Cais do Sodré ⇄ Estação Oriente (Interface) (morning service)
 210 Cais do Sodré ⇄ Prior Velho (morning service)
 400 Parque das Nações Norte ⇄ Parque das Nações Sul
 705 Estação Oriente (Interface) ⇄ Estação Roma-Areeiro
 708 Martim Moniz ⇄ Parque das Nações Norte
 725 Estação Oriente (Interface) ⇄ Prior Velho - Rua Maestro Lopes Graç
 728 Restelo - Av. das Descobertas ⇄ Portela - Av. dos Descobrimentos
 744 Marquês de Pombal ⇄ Moscavide (Quinta das Laranjeiras)
 750 Estação Oriente (Interface) ⇄ Algés
 759 Restauradores ⇄ Estação Oriente (Interface)
 782 Cais do Sodré ⇄ Praça José Queirós
 794 Terreiro do Paço ⇄ Estação Oriente (Interface)

Suburban buses

Rodoviária de Lisboa 

 301 Lisboa (Estação Oriente) ⇄ Loures (Zona Comercial) via Hospital
 305 Lisboa (Estação Oriente) ⇄ Loures
 308 Urbana de Estação Oriente circulação via Sacavém
 309 Lisboa (Estação Oriente) ⇄ Cabeço de Aguieira
 310 Lisboa (Estação Oriente) ⇄ Charneca do Lumiar
 316 Lisboa (Estação Oriente)) ⇄ Santa Iria da Azóia
 317 Lisboa (Estação Oriente) ⇄ Bairro da Covina
 318 Lisboa (Estação Oriente) ⇄ Portela da Azóia
 330 Lisboa (Estação Oriente) ⇄ Forte da Casa
 347 Lisboa (Estação Oriente) ⇄ Alverca (Arcena)
 750 Lisboa (Estação Oriente) circulação via Bairro das Coroas e Unhos

Transportes Sul do Tejo 
 333 Lisboa (Gare do Oriente) ⇄ Vale da Amoreira
 431 Lisboa ⇄ Montijo
 432 Atalaia ⇄ Lisboa (via Alcochete)
 435 Lisboa ⇄ Samouco (via Montijo)
 437 Lisboa ⇄ Montijo (via São Francisco)
 453 Lisboa (Gare do Oriente) ⇄ São Francisco (via Montijo)
 562 Lisboa ⇄ Setúbal (via Ponte Vasco da Gama) (Rápida)
 565 Lisboa ⇄ Setúbal (via Ponte Vasco da Gama e Pinhal Novo) (Rápida)

Rail

Comboios de Portugal 
 Sintra ⇄ Lisboa - Oriente
 Sintra ⇄ Alverca
 Alcântara-Terra ⇄ Castanheira do Ribatejo
 Lisboa - Santa Apolónia ⇄ Azambuja
 Lisboa - Santa Apolónia ⇄ Covilhã (Regional)
 Lisboa - Santa Apolónia ⇄ Leiria (Regional)
 Lisboa - Santa Apolónia ⇄ Tomar (Regional)
 Lisboa - Santa Apolónia ⇄ Entroncamento (Regional)
 Lisboa - Santa Apolónia ⇄ Porto - Campanhã (Regional)
 Lisboa - Santa Apolónia ⇄ Castelo Branco (Regional)
 Lisboa - Santa Apolónia ⇄ Pampilhosa (Regional)
 Lisboa - Santa Apolónia ⇄ Tomar (InterRegional)
 Lisboa - Santa Apolónia ⇄ Entroncamento (InterRegional)
 Lisboa - Santa Apolónia ⇄ Porto - Campanhã (InterRegional)
 Lisboa - Oriente ⇄ Évora (Intercities)
 Lisboa - Oriente ⇄ Faro (Intercities)
 Lisboa - Santa Apolónia ⇄ Porto - Campanhã (Intercities)
 Lisboa - Santa Apolónia ⇄ Braga (Intercities)
 Lisboa - Santa Apolónia ⇄ Guimarães (Intercities)
 Lisboa - Santa Apolónia ⇄ Guarda (Intercities)
 Lisboa - Santa Apolónia ⇄ Covilhã (Intercities)
 Lisboa - Santa Apolónia ⇄ Porto - Campanhã (Alfa Pendular)
 Lisboa - Santa Apolónia ⇄ Braga (Alfa Pendular)
 Lisboa - Santa Apolónia ⇄ Guimarães (Alfa Pendular)
 Porto - Campanhã ⇄ Faro (Alfa Pendular)
 Lisboa - Santa Apolónia ⇄ Hendaye (International)
 Lisboa - Santa Apolónia ⇄ Madrid (International)

See also
 List of Lisbon metro stations

References

External links

Red Line (Lisbon Metro) stations
Railway stations opened in 1998